Christoph Friedrich Jäger Ritter von Jaxtthal (4 September 1784 – 25 December 1871) was an Austrian ophthalmologist who was a native of Kirchberg an der Jagst.

Early life and education
He studied medicine in Vienna and Landshut, and in 1809 became a physician in the Napoleonic Wars. He later returned to Vienna, where in 1812 he received his medical degree at the university.

Career
In Vienna he served as an assistant to ophthalmologist Georg Joseph Beer (1763–1821), who would become his future father-in-law. From 1825 until 1848, he was a professor of ophthalmology at the Josephinum (school for military surgeons) in Vienna.

Friedrich Jäger von Jaxtthal was an influential physician and surgeon of ophthalmic medicine. Two of his more famous students in Vienna were Frédéric Jules Sichel (1802–1868) and Albrecht von Graefe (1828-1870). He was a personal physician to Prince Metternich (1773–1859), and the father of ophthalmologist Eduard Jäger von Jaxtthal (1818–1884).

Associated eponym
"Bartisch-Jaeger method": Historical eponym for surgical removal of the eyeball (bulbus oculi) for cancer of the eye. Named with German physician, Georg Bartisch (1535-1607). The procedure would later be improved upon by Italian ophthalmologist Francesco Flarer.

Selected writings
De karatonyxide,  Vienna, 1812.
De ägyptische Augenentzündung,  Vienna, 1840.

Notes

See also
Jäger (disambiguation)

1784 births
1871 deaths
People from Schwäbisch Hall (district)
Ophthalmologists from the Austrian Empire
University of Vienna alumni
Knights from the Austrian Empire